Marcel Adam Gromadowski (born 19 December 1985) is a Polish volleyball player, member of the Poland men's national volleyball team in 2005–2010, 2009 European Champion.

Career

Clubs
After graduating from the School of Sports Championship he moved to the club from PlusLiga. He was considered "one of the best attackers of the young generation in Poland" by many coaches. He made his debut in the team Mostostal-Azoty Kędzierzyn-Koźle in 2004. In the season 2007/2008 together with his Italian club Copra Piacenza won the silver medal in the Italian Championship and was a silver medalist of the Champions League. After a game of another Italian, French and Polish club he signed a contract with the Greek GS Iraklis, but after one month he moved to French Montpellier UC. Currently, he plays to Volley Brolo since 2013. In June 2014 signed a contract with Polish club MKS Cuprum Lubin. On July 1, 2015 he signed one-year contract with PGE Skra Bełchatów. On February 7, 2016 he played with PGE Skra and won the 2016 Polish Cup after beating ZAKSA in the final. In April 2016 he was a member of the same team which won a bronze medal in the 2015–16 PlusLiga championship.

In May 2016, he signed a contract with Łuczniczka Bydgoszcz.

National team
Gromadowski was in the Polish squad when the Polish national team won the gold medal of European Championship 2009. On September 14, 2009 he was awarded Knight's Cross of Polonia Restituta.

Sporting achievements

Clubs
 CEV Champions League
  2007/2008 – with Copra Piacenza

 National championships
 2007/2008  Italian Championship, with Copra Piacenza
 2015/2016  Polish Cup, with PGE Skra Bełchatów

Youth national team
 2003  CEV U19 European Championship
 2003  European Youth Olympic Festival
 2003  FIVB U21 World Championship

Individual awards
 2003: CEV U19 European Championship – Best Opposite

State awards
 2009:  Knight's Cross of Polonia Restituta

References

External links
 
 Player profile at LegaVolley.it 
 Player profile at PlusLiga.pl 
 Player profile at Volleybox.net 

1985 births
Living people
Sportspeople from Wrocław
Polish men's volleyball players
Knights of the Order of Polonia Restituta
Polish expatriate sportspeople in Italy
Expatriate volleyball players in Italy
Polish expatriate sportspeople in France
Expatriate volleyball players in France
Polish expatriate sportspeople in Greece
Expatriate volleyball players in Greece
Polish expatriate sportspeople in Turkey
Expatriate volleyball players in Turkey
Polish expatriate sportspeople in the Czech Republic
Expatriate volleyball players in the Czech Republic
ZAKSA Kędzierzyn-Koźle players
AZS Olsztyn players
Cuprum Lubin players
Skra Bełchatów players
BKS Visła Bydgoszcz players
Gwardia Wrocław players